Joint Base Lewis–McChord (JBLM) is a U.S. military installation home to I Corps and 62nd Airlift Wing located  south-southwest of Tacoma, Washington under the jurisdiction of the United States Army Joint Base Headquarters, Joint Base Lewis–McChord. The facility is an amalgamation of the United States Army's Fort Lewis and the United States Air Force's McChord Air Force Base which merged on 1 February 2010 into a Joint Base as a result of Base Realignment and Closure Commission recommendations of 2005.

Joint Base Lewis–McChord is a training and mobilization center for all services and is the only Army power projection base west of the Rocky Mountains in the Continental United States. Its geographic location provides rapid access to the deepwater ports of Tacoma, Olympia, and Seattle for deploying equipment. Units can be deployed from McChord Field, and individuals and small groups can also use nearby Sea-Tac Airport. The strategic location of the base provides Air Force units with the ability to conduct combat and humanitarian airlift with the C-17 Globemaster III.

History

Fort Lewis 

In 1916, a combination of local civilian businessmen seeking the creation of a military base in the Puget Sound area and a military survey team approved a military post to be constructed near American Lake. Businessmen and Washington voters approved a donation of the land near American Lake to the United States government. The base (then known as Camp Lewis) would serve as a vital training base for United States soldiers during World War I. This base would be known as one of the most well managed and cheaply funded bases that were constructed during World War I. Additional construction of the camp would officially commemorate a renaming of Camp Lewis to Fort Lewis in 1927.

The construction of the base also included the seizure of Nisqually tribe reservation lands for their use as an artillery field. Legal seizure of the lands occurred through eminent domain and seizure, which resulted in tribal members being forced from their homes.

Units trained at Fort Lewis would serve with distinction in both the Pacific and European theaters during World War II. Prisoner of war compounds were constructed to house German and Italian POWs until the end of the war. Fort Lewis units also participated in major operations in the modern-day, including Operation Just Cause and Operations Desert Shield and Desert Storm.

McChord Air Force Base 

McChord Air Force Base was originally named Tacoma Field in 1927 when a local voting measure voted to create a municipal airport. This airport would be purchased by the United States government in 1938 and renamed McChord Field in May 1938 in honor of Colonel William McChord, who had died in an aircraft accident in Virginia. The early work and construction of the base prior to the start of World War II occurred under the Works Projects Administration. McChord Field served as a critical piece of defense infrastructure during World War II, training bomber aircraft pilots who would participate in the allied invasion of Italy, southern France, and the Doolittle Raid. McChord Field became McChord Air Force Base in 1948 with the formation of the United States Air Force as a separate division of the armed forces from the United States Army.

McChord Air Force Base served as an airlift base since the end of World War II. The base functions as a strategic airlift base participating in transport (such as in Operation Desert Shield), humanitarian (such as relief during 1992 typhoons, support during the eruption of Mount St. Helens in 1980, and support to New Orleans after Hurricane Katrina), and air defense roles (such as military interception in the aftermath of the 9/11 attacks).

Fort Lewis and McChord Air Force Base officially joined to form Joint Base Lewis McChord in 2010 following the apolitical Base Realignment and Closure Commissions recommendations in 2005.

Geography and environment 
The large protected lands available to military reservations makes environmental protection significantly important worldwide. Both formerly named Fort Lewis and McChord Air Force Base lands have been used as areas to conduct significant environmental studies. The use of military equipment on the base reservation contains the potential to damage environmental habitats. United States military facilities have implemented and continue to implement practices that include environmental preservation and protections.

Joint Base Headquarters
The Joint Base Headquarters (JBHQ) operates the installation to support the warfighting units, their families and the extended military community.  The mission of the JBHQ is to provide support to mission commanders and the joint base community, to serve as an enabler to the soldiers as they train and project America's combat power, and to make JBLM the station of choice for American soldiers and their families.

With an Army joint base commander and an Air Force deputy joint base commander, the JBHQ supports the installation through directorates and agencies that provide a full range of city services and quality-of-life functions; everything from facility maintenance recreation and family programs to training support and emergency services.

The major organizations that make up the bulk of the JBHQ include:
 Directorates of Public Works: Logistics
 Family and Morale, Welfare and Recreation
 Human Resources; Emergency Services
 Directorate of Plans, Training, Mobilization, and Security (DPTMS)

Additional staff offices that support the installation mission include the Joint Base Public Affairs Office, the Religious Support Office, the Resource Management Office, Equal Employment Opportunity Office, the Joint Base Safety Office and the Plans, Analysis and Integration Office. Other partners who work closely with the JBHQ include the Civilian Personnel Advisory Center, the Mission and Installation Contracting Command and Joint Personal Property Shipping Office.

Two military units support the JBHQ
 627th Air Base Group
 Provides command and control and administrative oversight to the Airmen who perform installation support duties on behalf of the Joint Base Commander.
 Headquarters and Headquarters Company, JBLM
 Provides administrative oversight to the Army personnel in the JBHQ and supports newly arrived soldiers during their in-processing period.

JBLM Service Members receive medical care through on-base facilities such as Madigan Army Medical Center, the Okubo Clinic, the Nisqually Clinic, and the McChord Clinic.

In 2010, Joint Base Lewis–McChord was called the U.S. military's "most troubled base" 2010 by Stars and Stripes newspaper. By 2015, the base had changed its public image, winning recognition in the Army Communities of Excellence awards program with a Silver Award in 2012, and Bronze Awards in 2013 and 2014.

JBLM overview
JBLM has two Senior Service Component Commanders, one Army (Commander, I Corps) and one Air Force (Commander, 62nd Airlift Wing), and has more than 45,000 service members and civilian workers. The post supports over 120,000 military retirees and more than 29,000 family members living both on and off post. The base has a total active population of nearly 210,000 inhabitants, making it the fourth largest military installment worldwide by population. JBLM consists of four geographical areas, Lewis Main, Lewis North, McChord Field, and Yakima Training Center.

JBLM Lewis Main, Lewis North and McChord Field have abundant high-quality, close-in training areas, including 115 live-fire ranges. Additional training space is available at Yakima Training Center in eastern Washington, including maneuver areas and additional live-fire ranges.

In 2009, the former Fort Lewis Regional Correctional Facility was remodeled and renamed the Northwest Joint Regional Correctional Facility (NWJRCF). The facility houses minimum and medium security prisoners from all branches of the U.S. Armed Forces.

JBLM Lewis North hosted the Leader Development and Assessment Course, a capstone program for the U.S. Army's ROTC program until it was relocated to Fort Knox, KY in 2014.

Camp Murray (Washington National Guard) is adjacent to the post.

References

 Attribution

Further reading
 Alan Archambault, Fort Lewis, Arcadia Publishing, 2002,

External links

 
 Joint Base Lewis–McChord – Directorate of Family and Morale, Welfare & Recreation
 Lewis Army Museum
 McChord Air Museum
 
 

 
Joint bases of the U.S. Department of Defense
Military installations in Washington (state)
Military police of the United States
United States Army Corrections Command
Buildings and structures in Pierce County, Washington
Buildings and structures in Thurston County, Washington
Airports in Washington (state)
Military units and formations established in 2010
2010 establishments in Washington (state)